Earthbound is a 1940 film directed by Irving Pichel. It stars Warner Baxter and Andrea Leeds. It is a remake of the 1920 silent film of the same name, Earthbound. Critical reception to the film was generally negative.

Plot
Husband and wife Nick (Warner Baxter) and Ellen (Andrea Leeds) go mountain climbing in Switzerland, where Nick is murdered, becoming an "earthbound" ghost. Only after his murderer confesses is Nick's ghost freed.

Production
Directed by Irving Pichel, Earthbound was proposed as a star vehicle for actor Warner Baxter, whose career was declining. It would be the final film he made for 20th Century Fox. Sol M. Wurtzel adapted Earthbound into a 67-minute film, while also slightly modifying the story.

John Howard Lawson and Samuel G. Engel wrote the screenplay for the film. Lawson proposed the film be set during World War I with "people going about customary tasks, wearing gas masks ... two lovers parting on a street corner, trying to say goodbye, unable to take off their masks." Darryl F. Zanuck rejected the idea.

Reception
In a contemporary review in The New York Times, reviewer Bosley Crowther wrote that "we can only describe "Earthbound" as a solemn piece of foolishness so preposterous that it borders on farce." Several decades later, film historian Leonard Maltin gave Earthbound two stars out of four, calling it a "strange little fantasy" with "a deadly serious mixture of half-baked philosophy and heavy-handed special effects." TV Guide gave the film two and a half stars out of four, calling the film's idea "farfetched" but opining it was done well. AllMovie writer Bruce Eder's review graded the film two and a half stars out of five. Although he believed some of the plot elements were "incredulous" and the film's "sentimentality seems dated", he praised the film's acting, opining it was "above average" for a B movie, and wrote positively of Pichel's directing work. In the book American Silent Horror, Science Fiction and Fantasy Feature Films, 1913-1929, author John T. Soister compared the film to the original. He noted that while the original was lost, the 1940 version was still available. He commented that "it seems the wrong Earthbound has disappeared."

References

External links
 

1940 films
Films directed by Irving Pichel
Remakes of American films
Sound film remakes of silent films
20th Century Fox films
1940s fantasy films
American black-and-white films
American romantic fantasy films
Films about the afterlife
1940s romantic fantasy films
1940s supernatural films
1940s American films